Garysville is an unincorporated community in Prince George County, Virginia, United States.  It is located on State Route 10 about 12 miles east of Petersburg.

The Flowerdew Hundred Plantation, listed on the National Register of Historic Places, is located in Garysville.

External links
 National Register listing for Flowerdew Hundred Plantation

References

Unincorporated communities in Virginia
Unincorporated communities in Prince George County, Virginia